Onarheim Church is a parish church of the Church of Norway in Tysnes Municipality in Vestland county, Norway. It is located in the village of Onarheim on the southeastern side of the island of Tysnesøya. It is the church for the Onarheim parish which is part of the Sunnhordland prosti (deanery) in the Diocese of Bjørgvin. The white, wooden church was built in a long church design in 1893 using plans drawn up by the architect Karl Askeland from Radøy. The church seats about 500 people.

History
The earliest existing historical records of the church date back to the year 1327, but the church was not new that year. The first church at Onarheim was a stone church that was probably built in the late 1100s. At some point before 1686, the old stone chancel was torn down and replaced with a new wooden chancel on the same location. The church was sold into private ownership in 1723. In 1819–1820, the church was in disrepair, so it was completely renovated and rebuilt. The entire stone nave was demolished and rebuilt and the choir was heavily renovated. In 1862, the municipality of Tysnes bought back the church from private ownership. As the population of the parish increased, the church eventually became too small, so in 1893, the whole church was torn down and a new wooden long church was built on the same site. The new church was consecrated on 7 July 1893 by the Bishop Fredrik Waldemar Hvoslef.

See also
List of churches in Bjørgvin

References

Tysnes
Churches in Vestland
Long churches in Norway
Wooden churches in Norway
19th-century Church of Norway church buildings
Churches completed in 1893
12th-century establishments in Norway